The Roman Catholic Archdiocese of Maceió is an archdiocese located in the city of Maceió in Brazil.

History
 July 2, 1900: Established as Diocese of Alagôas from the Diocese of Olinda
 August 25, 1917: Renamed as Diocese of Maceió
 February 13, 1920: Promoted as Metropolitan Archdiocese of Maceió

Bishops

Ordinaries, in reverse chronological order
 Archbishops of Maceió (Roman rite), below
 Archbishop Antônio Muniz Fernandes, O.Carm. (2006.11.22 – present)
 Archbishop José Carlos Melo, C.M. (2002.07.03 – 2006.11.22)
 Archbishop Edvaldo Gonçalves Amaral, S.D.B. (1985.10.24 – 2002.07.03)
 Archbishop José Lamartine Soares (1985.04.02 – 1985.08.18)
 Archbishop Miguel Fenelon Câmara Filho (1976.11.24 – 1984.10.07), appointed Archbishop of Teresina, Piaui
 Archbishop Adelmo Cavalcante Machado (1963.10.19 – 1976.11.24)
 Archbishop Ranulfo da Silva Farias (1939.08.05 – 1963.10.19)
 Archbishop Santino Maria da Silva Coutinho (1923.01.19 – 1939.01.10)
 Archbishop Manoel Antônio de Oliveira Lopes (1920.02.13 – 1922.07.27)
 Bishops of Maceió (Roman Rite), below 
 Bishop Manoel Antônio de Oliveira Lopes (later Archbishop) (1910.11.26 – 1920.02.13)
 Bishops of Alagôas (Roman Rite), below
 Bishop Antônio Manoel de Castilho Brandão (1901.06.05 – 1910.03.15)

Coadjutor archbishops
Adelmo Cavalcante Machado (1955-1963)
Miguel Fenelon Câmara Filho (1974-1976)
José Carlos Melo, C.M. (2000-2002)

Auxiliary bishop
Eliseu Maria Gomes de Oliveira, O. Carm. (1968-1974), appointed Bishop of Caetité, Bahia

Other priests of this diocese who became bishops
José Maurício da Rocha, appointed Bishop of Corumbá, Mato Grosso do Sul in 1919
Henrique Soares da Costa, appointed Auxiliary Bishop of Aracajú, Sergipe in 2009

Suffragan dioceses
 Diocese of Palmeira dos Índios
 Diocese of Penedo

Sources

 GCatholic.org
 Catholic Hierarchy

Roman Catholic dioceses in Brazil
Roman Catholic ecclesiastical provinces in Brazil
 
Christian organizations established in 1900
Roman Catholic dioceses and prelatures established in the 19th century